Christ Episcopal Church is a historic Episcopal church located at 412 Summit Avenue in Walnut Cove, Stokes County, North Carolina. It was built in 1886–1887, and is a one-story, Gothic Revival style board-and-batten frame building. It was moved to its present located in 1909.  It features lancet-arched windows and a two-stage entrance tower and belfry.  An addition was built in 1943.

It was added to the National Register of Historic Places in 2005.

References

Episcopal church buildings in North Carolina
Churches on the National Register of Historic Places in North Carolina
Gothic Revival church buildings in North Carolina
Churches completed in 1887
19th-century Episcopal church buildings
Churches in Stokes County, North Carolina
National Register of Historic Places in Stokes County, North Carolina